Vaidas Žutautas (born 12 May 1973) is a Lithuanian football manager and a former international player, who played as a goalkeeper.

Žutautas has made nine appearances for the Lithuania national football team between 1996 and 2006.

Honours
National Team
 Baltic Cup
 2005

References

futbolas.lt profilis

1973 births
Living people
Lithuanian footballers
Lithuania international footballers
Royal Antwerp F.C. players
Hakoah Maccabi Ramat Gan F.C. players
Wigry Suwałki players
Expatriate footballers in Israel
Association football goalkeepers
Lithuanian football managers
FC Šiauliai players
FK Banga Gargždai managers